William McBride may refer to:

William McBride (doctor) (1927–2018), Australian physician
Will McBride (photographer) (1931–2015), American photographer based in Germany
Bill McBride (politician) (1945–2012), 2002 candidate for Florida governor
William V. McBride (1922–2022), general in the United States Air Force, Vice Chief of Staff of the United States Air Force
William McBride (artist), African-American artist, designer and collector
Bill McBride (blogger), author of Calculated Risk
Willie John McBride (William James McBride, born 1940), former rugby union footballer

See also
"No Man's Land" (Eric Bogle song), a 1976 song also known as "Willie McBride"